Events in the year 2020 in São Tomé and Príncipe.

Incumbents 

 President: Evaristo Carvalho
 Prime Minister: Jorge Bom Jesus

Events 
Ongoing — COVID-19 pandemic in São Tomé and Príncipe

 6 April – The first four cases of COVID-19 in the country were confirmed.
 30 April – A 55-year-old man living in Cantalago is the first COVID-19 death in the country.

Deaths 

 19 November – Alcino Pinto, 64, São Toméan politician, president of the National Assembly (2012–2014).

See also 

 List of years in São Tomé and Príncipe

References 

 
2020s in São Tomé and Príncipe
Years of the 21st century in São Tomé and Príncipe
Sao Tome and Principe
Sao Tome and Principe